Tuomarinkylä is a neighbourhood in Northern Helsinki. It comprises  Haltiala, Paloheinä, Torpparinmäki and Tuomarinkartano.

External links 

 Tuomarinkylä museum

Neighbourhoods of Helsinki